Klemperer – Ein Leben in Deutschland is a German television series based on the diary of Victor Klemperer.

See also
List of German television series

External links
 

1999 German television series debuts
1999 German television series endings
Television series set in the 1930s
Television series set in the 1940s
World War II television drama series
Television series based on actual events
German-language television shows
Das Erste original programming